Chymophila is a subgenus of the hoverfly genus Microdon. It was previously considered to be exclusively Neotropical, but is now also known from the Nearctic and Oriental realms, and one species is known from Japan. Chymophila was based on a composite type species: the holotype is a body of C. fulgens with the head of a conopid glued on.

Species
There are 33 species described in Chymophila:

Nearctic:
 Microdon fulgens Wiedemann, 1830 (Synonyms: Microdon euglossoides Gray, 1832; Chymophila splendens Macquart, 1834)

Neotropical:
 Microdon angulatus Hull, 1943
 Microdon argentinae Hull, 1937
 Microdon aurifacius Hull, 1937
 Microdon barbiellinii Curran, 1936
 Microdon bruchi Shannon, 1927
 Microdon cyaneiventris Macquart, 1846 (Synonym: Aphritis cyanoventris Williston, 1886 (misspelling))
 Microdon cyaneus Perty, 1833
 Microdon emeralda Hull, 1943
 Microdon flavoluna Hull, 1943
 Microdon histrio Wiedemann, 1830
 Microdon inaequalis Loew, 1866
 Microdon instabilis Wiedemann, 1830 (Synonyms: Aphritis dives Rondani, 1848; Microdon aurifex Wiedemann, 1830; Microdon trochilus Walker, 1852)
 Microdon limbatus Wiedemann, 1830
 Microdon marceli Curran, 1936
 Microdon nero Curran, 1936
 Microdon nestor Curran, 1940
 Microdon opulentus Bigot, 1883
 Microdon pulcher Williston, 1887
 Microdon shannoni Curran, 1940
 Microdon splendens Wiedemann, 1830
 Microdon stramineus Hull, 1943
 Microdon superbus Wiedemann, 1830
 Microdon tigrinus Curran, 1940
 Microdon willistoni Mik, 1899 (Synonym: Microdon inermis Williston, 1888 (nec Loew, 1858))

Oriental:
 Microdon aenoviridis Curran, 1931
 Microdon baramus Curran, 1942
 Microdon beatus Curran, 1942
 Microdon latiscutellaris Curran, 1931
 Microdon lativentris Meijere, 1921 (Synonym: Microdon grandis Curran, 1928)
 Microdon lundura Curran, 1942
 Microdon stilboides Walker, 1849

Palaearctic:
 Microdon katsurai Maruyama & Hironaga, 2004

References

Insect subgenera
Microdontinae
Diptera of South America
Diptera of North America
Diptera of Asia
Taxa named by Pierre-Justin-Marie Macquart